Hernán Madrid (born April 2, 1981) is a naturalized Palestinian retired football defender, who played for Wadi Al-Nes.  He is currently assistant coach to Fernando Vergara in Deportes Iquique, Chile.

External links

1981 births
Living people
Palestinian footballers
Palestine international footballers
Chilean footballers
Chilean people of Palestinian descent
Chilean emigrants to Palestine
Club Deportivo Universidad Católica footballers
San Luis de Quillota footballers
Unión La Calera footballers
C.D. Antofagasta footballers
C.D. Huachipato footballers
Association football central defenders